Zsuzsanna Eva Ward (born June 2, 1986) known professionally as ZZ Ward, is an American singer-songwriter.

Ward released her debut EP, Criminal, on May 8, 2012. Her debut album, Til the Casket Drops, was released on October 16, 2012. "Put The Gun Down", her first single, broke into the top 10 on the AAA radio chart on February 3, 2013, staying there for 10 weeks, and also broke into the top 40 on the Billboard Alternative chart. On March 2, 2017, Ward released the single "The Deep" (featuring Joey Purp). Her second studio album, The Storm, was released on June 30, 2017, peaking at number 1 on the Billboard Blues Albums Chart in July 2017.

Early life
Ward grew up in Roseburg, Oregon. In Roseburg, she joined her first band, with her father, at the age of 12. Ward recalled the first song she sang was "an Albert King track called 'As the Years Go Passing By'".

Ward's maternal grandmother, Zsuzsanna Friedman, was a Jewish Hungarian who converted to Catholicism to avoid persecution during the Holocaust. On discovering this, Ward, who grew up in a secular household, took an interest in reclaiming her Jewish roots.

Career

Debut EP and Til the Casket Drops (2011–15)
After moving to Los Angeles and signing to E. Kidd Bogart's Boardwalk Entertainment Group, Ward began recording the Criminal EP, as well as Eleven Roses, a free mixtape on which she offered her interpretations of tracks by Kendrick Lamar, Childish Gambino, Tyler, the Creator, Freddie Gibbs and Wiz Khalifa. Eleven Roses features Better Of Dead, Got It Bad, Overdue, Criminal, Morphine and Cinnamon Stix, it was released on 3 November 2011. For the recording of "Criminal", she sampled the beat from "Oil Money" by Freddie Gibbs, who was so impressed by Ward's remake that he asked to contribute a guest verse to the official version on the EP. The Criminal EP was released on May 8, 2012, and features the songs "Til the Casket Drops", "Put the Gun Down", "Move Like U Stole It", and "Criminal" (feat. Freddie Gibbs).

Ward's debut album, Til the Casket Drops, was released on October 16, 2012. It includes the singles "365 Days", "Put the Gun Down" and "Last Love Song", the song "Cryin' Wolf" with Kendrick Lamar, as well as appearances from Ryan Tedder, Ali Shaheed Muhammad, Theron "Neff-U" Feemster and Fitz of Fitz and the Tantrums. Ward performed the album's first single, "Put The Gun Down", on VH1's Big Morning Buzz Live with Carrie Keagan on September 19, 2012, The Tonight Show with Jay Leno on November 1, 2012, and Conan on January 10, 2013. In March 2013, the New York Times said of Ward, "Her energy evokes Tina Turner's, her chops Aretha Franklin's and her soul Etta James's", and she was named one of Fuse TV's 30 must-see artists at SXSW. Ward performed her second single, "365 Days", on Good Morning America and Big Morning Buzz Live, both on March 7, 2013; on the September 3, 2013 episode of The Tonight Show with Jay Leno; and on the January 30, 2014 episode of The Late Late Show with Craig Ferguson. In May 2013, Ward, in conjunction with her second single release, launched her 365 Days of ZZ Ward app.

On April 20, 2013 for Record Store Day, Ward released a limited edition 7-inch vinyl that included her cover of "Grinnin in Your Face", written and originally recorded by Son House, and a previously unreleased song, "Everybody Wants to Be Famous". The 7-inch cover features an image taken of Ward when she was 11 years-old.

Notable live appearances in 2014 include Coachella Valley Music and Arts Festival, Bonnaroo Music Festival, and a short tour with Eric Clapton.

Second EP and The Storm (2015–present)
Ward's second EP, Love and War, was released on Hollywood Records on August 28, 2015.

On March 2, 2017, Ward released the single "The Deep", featuring Chicago MC Joey Purp. The track is built around a sample of "As Long As I've Got You" by The Charmels, which is also sampled in "C.R.E.A.M." by Wu-Tang Clan. The song is about Ward's feelings of being trapped in a bad relationship. The song's music video premiered on W magazine's website on March 9, 2017. Also in 2017, Ward collaborated with Gary Clark Jr. on "Ride" from the soundtrack to the Pixar film Cars 3. Ward performed "Ride" on Dancing with the Stars on April 17, 2017.

On February 11, 2017, Ward performed at the Americana Music Association's tribute concert to Loretta Lynn at the Troubadour in West Hollywood, California, performing a cover of "The Home You're Tearing Down". She performed at the inaugural Arroyo Seco Weekend festival in June 2017 at the Rose Bowl in Pasadena, California.

Ward's second studio album, The Storm, was released on June 30, 2017 through Hollywood Records. It peaked at number 1 on the Billboard Blues Albums chart in July 2017, at number 12 on the Billboard Rock Albums chart, and at number 75 on the Billboard 200. The music video for the single "Cannonball" (featuring Fantastic Negrito) was released in July 2017.

Personal life
Ward married record producer E. Kidd Bogart in May 2017. Their first child, Ezra Jack Bogart, was born on February 3, 2021. Ward announced her pregnancy in November 2020 in the music video for her song "Giant."

Filmography

Discography

Studio albums

EPs

Mixtapes

Singles

As lead artist

As featured artist

Guest appearances

TV and film soundtrack appearances 
 "Til the Casket Drops" – Pretty Little Liars, ABC Family, season 3 promo, 2012
 "Move Like U Stole It" – Awkward, MTV, season 2 finale, 2012; The Good Wife, season 5 promo, 2013; Shameless, Showtime, season 4, 2014
 "365 Days" – The View, ABC, opening theme song, 2013
 "Put the Gun Down" – We're the Millers, 2013
 "Home" – The Vineyard, ABC Family, season 1, episode 7, 2013
 "Got It Bad" – Ironside, NBC, 2013
 "Criminal" – Veronica Mars, 2014; Reckless, CBS, season 1, episode 1, 2014
 "Last Love Song" – Pretty Little Liars, ABC Family, Summer 2014 promo; The Vineyard, ABC Family, 2014
 "Charlie Ain't Home" – Single Ladies, VH1, season 3, episode 5, 2014; Justified, FX, season 5, episode 10, 2014
 "Ride" (featuring Gary Clark Jr.) – Cars 3, 2017
 "Runnin' Down a Dream" (cover of Tom Petty song from 1989) - ''NASCAR on NBC opening theme, 2018

Music videos

See also
List of current Hollywood Records artists

References

External links
 
 

1986 births
21st-century American composers
American women guitarists
American women singer-songwriters
Living people
People from Roseburg, Oregon
Guitarists from Oregon
Hollywood Records artists
American rhythm and blues singer-songwriters
Blues rock musicians
21st-century American women musicians
21st-century American singers
21st-century American women singers
Jewish singers
People of Hungarian-Jewish descent
21st-century women composers
Singer-songwriters from Oregon